Sports Coaching Foundation is an NGO in Hyderabad, Telangana state, India, founded in 1991 by ex-Andhra Ranji cricketer Kammela Saibaba.

In 2015 the group received the India NGO Award from the New York-based Rockefeller Foundation and the UK-based Resource Alliance, for its contribution to "social reconstruction through promoting sports amongst the under-privileged".

References

External links 

Cricket academies
Sport schools in India
Recipients of the Rashtriya Khel Protsahan Puruskar
1991 establishments in Andhra Pradesh